A freedom song is a song sung by participants in the United States civil rights movement.

Freedom Song may refer to:

Books
Freedom Song: The Story of Henry "Box" Brown, by Sally M. Walker and illustrated by Sean Qualls
Freedom Song: A Personal Story of the 1960s Civil Rights Movement, by Mary King, 1987
Freedom Song: Three Novels, by Amit Chaudhuri, 2000

Film and TV
Freedom Song (film), a 2000 film about the Civil Rights Movement

Music
Freedom Song, an event at the Tallinn Song Festival Grounds Ewert and The Two Dragons

Albums
Freedom Song (Oscar Peterson album)
Freedom Song by James Horner, the soundtrack to the 2000 film

Songs
"Freedom Song", a 1971 version of the traditional protest song by Roberta Flack
"Freedom Song", a 1975 rock song by the band Thin Lizzy
"Freedom Song", a song by Wino (band) from Everlast (2002)
"Freedom Song", a 2005 song by Luc and the Lovingtons
"The Freedom Song", a 2013 cover version of the Luc and the Lovingtons song by Jason Mraz
"The Freedom Song (They'll Never Take Us Down)", a 2013 song by Neil Diamond
'Think' by Aretha Franklin (from the film Blues Brothers) contains the refrain Freedom! Freedom! Freedom!

See also
Song of Freedom, a 1936 British film starring Paul Robeson.